Bulldog Field is a 500-seat baseball park in Huntsville, Alabama. It is home to the Alabama A&M Bulldogs baseball team of the NCAA Division I Southwestern Athletic Conference. The venue has a capacity of 500 spectators.

See also
 Alabama A&M Bulldogs baseball

References

External links
 Bulldog Baseball Field

College baseball venues in the United States
Baseball venues in Alabama
Alabama A&M Bulldogs baseball